Cahaba, also spelled Cahawba, was the first permanent state capital of Alabama from 1820 to 1825, and the county seat of Dallas County, Alabama until 1866. Located at the confluence of the Alabama and Cahaba rivers, it suffered regular seasonal flooding.

The state legislature moved the capital to Tuscaloosa in 1826. After the town suffered another major flood in 1865, the state legislature moved the county seat northeast to Selma, which was better situated.

The former settlement became defunct after it lost the county seat, although it had been quite wealthy during the antebellum years. It is now a ghost town and is preserved as a state historic site, the Old Cahawba Archeological Park. The state and associated citizens' groups are working to develop it as a full interpretive park St. Luke's Episcopal Church was returned to Old Cahawba, and a fundraising campaign is underway for its restoration.

Demographics

Cahawba was listed on the 1860-1880 U.S. Censuses. Although it remained incorporated until as late as 1989, it did not appear on the United States census rolls after 1880.

History

Capital
Cahaba had its beginnings as an undeveloped town site at the confluence of the Alabama and Cahaba rivers. At the old territorial capital of St. Stephens, a commission was formed on February 13, 1818, to select the site for Alabama's state capital. Cahaba was the site chosen and was approved on November 21, 1818.  Due to the future capital site being undeveloped, Alabama's constitutional convention took temporary accommodations in Huntsville until a statehouse could be built.

Governor William Wyatt Bibb reported in October 1819 that the town had been laid out and that lots would be auctioned to the highest bidders. The town was planned on a grid system, with streets running north and south named for trees and those running east and west named for famous men. By 1820 Cahaba had become a functioning state capital.

Due to its lowland location at the confluence of two large rivers, Cahaba was subject to seasonal flooding. It also had a reputation for an unhealthy atmosphere, when people thought that miasma in the air caused such diseases as malaria, yellow fever, and cholera. The numerous mosquitoes carried disease.

People who were opposed to the capital's location at Cahaba used this as an argument for moving the capital to Tuscaloosa, which was approved by the legislature in January 1826. That was not a long-term success, and it was moved again in 1846 to centrally located Montgomery, Alabama.

After the relocation of the capital, Cahaba was adversely affected by the loss of state government and associated business.

Antebellum
The town served as the county seat of Dallas County for several more decades. Based on revenues from the cotton trade, the town recovered from losing the capital, and reestablished itself as a social and commercial center.

Centered in the fertile "Black Belt", Cahaba became a major distribution point for cotton shipped down the Alabama River to the Gulf port of Mobile. Successful planters and merchants built two-story mansions in town that expressed their wealth. St. Luke's Episcopal Church was built in 1854, designed by the nationally known architect, Richard Upjohn.

When Cahaba was connected to a railroad line in 1859, a building boom was stimulated. In 1860 On the eve of the American Civil War, the town had 2,000 residents, according to the US Census. Some 64% were enslaved African Americans, reflecting the population of Dallas County, which was 75% black. Most were fieldworkers on cotton plantations. But in the town, free people of color dominated the poultry business.

Civil War 
During the Civil War, the Confederate government seized Cahaba's railroad and appropriated the iron rails to extend a nearby railroad of more military importance. It built a stockade around a large cotton warehouse on the riverbank along Arch Street in order to use it as a prison, known as Castle Morgan. It was used for Union prisoners-of-war from 1863 to 1865.

In February 1865 a major flood inundated the town, causing much additional hardship for the roughly 3000 Union soldiers held in the prison, and for the town's residents. Confederate General Nathan Bedford Forrest and Union General James H. Wilson met in Cahaba at the Crocheron mansion to discuss an exchange of prisoners captured during the Battle of Selma.

Postbellum
In 1866, the state legislature moved the county seat to nearby Selma. Related businesses and population soon followed. Within ten years, many of the houses and churches in Cahaba were dismantled and moved away. St. Luke's Episcopal Church, for example, was moved in 1878 to Martin's Station.

Jeremiah Haralson represented Cahawba and Dallas County when elected to the State House, the State Senate and the United States Congress. He was the only African American in Alabama elected to all three legislative bodies during Reconstruction.

Together with the minority of whites, most freedmen rapidly left the declining town. By 1870, the overall population was 431, and the number of blacks was 302. During the Reconstruction era, freedmen organizing in the Republican Party and trying to keep their "moderate political gains" met regularly at the vacant county courthouse. Freedmen and their families gradually developed vacant town blocks into fields and garden plots. But they soon moved away.

Prior to the turn of the 20th century, a freedman purchased most of the old town site for $500. He had the abandoned buildings demolished for their building materials and shipped the material by steamboat to Mobile and Selma for use in growing communities. By 1903, most of Cahawba's buildings were gone; only a handful of structures survived past 1930.

Modern
Although the area is no longer inhabited, the Alabama Historical Commission maintains the site as Old Cahawba Archeological Park. It was added to the National Register of Historic Places in 1973.  Visitors to this park can see many of the abandoned streets, cemeteries, and ruins of this former state capital and county seat. The Cahawba Advisory Committee is a non-profit group based in Selma that serves to support the park; it also maintains a website related to the park and its history. It is conducting fundraising to support the restoration of St. Luke's Episcopal Church, which was relocated to Old Cahawba in the early 21st century.

Folklore
The town, and later its abandoned site, was the setting for many ghost stories during the 19th and 20th centuries.  A widely known one tells of a ghostly orb in a now-vanished garden maze at the home of C. C. Pegues.  The house was located on a lot that occupied a block between Pine and Chestnut streets.  The purported haunting was recorded in “Specter in the Maze at Cahaba” in 13 Alabama Ghosts and Jeffrey.

Notable people
George Henry Craig, born in Cahaba, former U.S. Representative
Anderson Crenshaw, former Alabama judge who served in the circuit and state court when this was the state capital
Jeremiah Haralson, born in Dallas County, he was the only African American in the state elected to the State House, State Senate, and Congress during the Reconstruction era. Was deprived of re-election in 1876 by fraud by the Dallas County Sheriff General Charles M. Shelley.
Edward Martineau Perine, merchant and planter; owner of the Perine Store and the Perine Mansion on Vine Street

Gallery

See also
Reportedly haunted locations in Alabama

References

Bibliography
Fry, Anna M. Gayle. Memories of Old Cahaba. Nashville, Tenn: Publishing House of the Methodist Episcopal Church, South, 1908.
 Meador, Daniel J., "Riding Over the Past? Cahaba, 1936", Virginia Quarterly Review, Winter 2002.

External links

 Old Cahawba - Civil War Album
 Old Cahawba Archaeological Park - Alabama Historical Commission
 Cahawba Advisory Committee
 The Cahaba Foundation
 
 
 
 
 
 
 
 

National Register of Historic Places in Dallas County, Alabama
Alabama
Populated places established in 1818
Ghost towns in Alabama
Reportedly haunted locations in Alabama
History of Alabama
Archaeological sites in Alabama
Archaeological sites on the National Register of Historic Places in Alabama
Alabama in the American Civil War
Alabama placenames of Native American origin
Geography of Dallas County, Alabama
Protected areas of Dallas County, Alabama
Parks in Alabama
Alabama State Historic Sites
Former county seats in Alabama
Museums in Dallas County, Alabama
Historic American Buildings Survey in Alabama
Populated places on the National Register of Historic Places in Alabama
Ghost towns in the United States
Ghost towns in North America